Joshua S. Parens is an American philosopher and Professor of Philosophy at the University of Dallas. He is the dean of Braniff Graduate School of Liberal Arts. Parens is known for his expertise on Islamic and Jewish medieval philosophy.

Books
 Leo Strauss and the Recovery of Medieval Political Philosophy. University of Rochester Press, 2016.
 Maimonides and Spinoza: Their Conflicting Views of Human Nature. University of Chicago Press, 2012.
 Medieval Political Philosophy: A Sourcebook. (edited in collaboration with Joseph C. Macfarland) 2nd edition. Cornell University Press, 2011.
 An Islamic Philosophy of Virtuous Religions: Introducing Alfarabi. State University of New York Press, 2006.
 Metaphysics as Rhetoric: Alfarabi's "Summary of Plato's Laws". State University of New York Press, 1995.
 The Foundations and Defense of Laws Plato's Laws and Farabi's Summary, 1992.

References

External links
 Joshua S. Parens at University of Dallas
 

21st-century American philosophers
Farabi scholars
Philosophy academics
University of Chicago alumni
St. John's University (New York City) alumni
University of Dallas faculty
Date of birth missing (living people)
Living people
Maimonides scholars
American political philosophers
Year of birth missing (living people)